Mulgrave Street is an album released by the band Amazing Blondel in 1974. It is their first album on the DJM Records label after leaving Island Records.

The album featured performances by Free guitarist Paul Kossoff, Curved Air and Roxy Music keyboardist and violinist Eddie Jobson, Pat Donaldson from Fotheringay, John "Rabbit" Bundrick and various members of Bad Company.

Track listing

Bonus tracks on the 2009 Japanese reissue

Musicians
 Eddie Baird – vocals, guitars, piano, bass guitar, percussion
 Terry Wincott – vocals (tracks A3, A5, B5), guitars, percussion, flute
 Paul Kossoff – lead guitar (track A5)
 Mick Ralphs – lead guitar (track B1)
 Eddie Jobson – keyboards, violin (tracks A1, B6)
 Rabbit Bundrick – keyboards (track B4)
 Mick Feat – bass guitar (tracks A1, A5)
 Alan Spenner – bass guitar (track A3)
 Boz Burrell – bass guitar (track B1)
 Pat Donaldson – bass guitar (track B5)
 William Murray – drums (tracks A1, A3–A5, B5)
 Simon Kirke – drums (tracks B1, B4)
 Sue Glover – backing vocals (tracks A5, B4)
 Sunny Leslie – backing vocals (tracks A5, B4)

References

Amazing Blondel albums
1974 albums
DJM Records albums